Mutya ng Pilipinas 2005, the 37th edition of Mutya ng Pilipinas, Inc., was held on June 11, 2005 in Intramuros, Manila. Maria Carmeniezinas Maxilom Nicolosi, came out victorious as the winner of Mutya ng Pilipinas Asia Pacific International 2005.

Results
Color keys

Special awards

Contestants

Crossovers from major national pageants prior to this date
None

Post-pageant notes
 Mutya ng Pilipinas Asia Pacific Int'l (Intercontinental), Maria Carmeniezinas Nicolosi was unable to compete internationally due to conflict of schedule. Last year's Mutya ng Pilipinas Asia Pacific International, Jedah Hernandez competed at the 2005 Miss Asia Pacific International in Guangzhou, China on April 9 placing 4th runner-up. The 2005 pageant was the last pageant ever held. 
 Since Maria Carmeniezinas was unavailable, Mutya ng Pilipinas 4th runner-up, Namkeen Hameed was the quick replacement for the July 30th Miss Intercontinental 2005 pageant in Huangshan, China but she was unplaced.
 Mutya 2nd runner-up, Arabella Hanesh competed at Miss Tourism International 2005 but unplaced
 Mutya 3rd runner-up, Abigail Lesley Cruz competed at Miss Tourism Queen of the Year 2005 and placed Top 12 semifinalist

References

External links
 Official Mutya ng Pilipinas website
  Mutya ng Pilipinas 2006 is on!

2005 beauty pageants
2005 in the Philippines
2005